Jerome Purcell "Jerry" Chambers (born July 18, 1943) is a retired American professional basketball player.  At 6'5" and 185 pounds, he played as a forward.

Early life
Chambers attended Spingarn High School in Washington, D.C., transferring to Eastern High School after being cut from the basketball team.

College career

Chambers then attended the University of Utah from 1963–1966, winning the NCAA basketball tournament Most Outstanding Player award in 1966, despite his Runnin' Utes finishing fourth at the 1966 Final Four.

Chambers is the only player to ever earn MOP for a fourth-place team (the 3rd place game was eliminated in 1981). His 143 points in four games remains an NCAA Tournament record, with 70 of them coming in the Final Four—38 against eventual national champion Texas-Western, and 32 more in the third-place game against the Duke Blue Devils.

For his career at Utah Chambers averaged a double-double, 24.6 points and 11.2 rebounds. As a senior in 1965–1966, he averaged 28.8 points and 11.6 rebounds. His 892 points in 1965–1966 remains second all time at Utah.

Professional career
He played four professional seasons in the National Basketball Association as a member of the Los Angeles Lakers (1966–1967), Phoenix Suns (1969–1970), Atlanta Hawks (1970–1971) and Buffalo Braves (1971–1972). Chambers then played two seasons in the American Basketball Association as a member of the San Diego Conquistadors (1972–1973) and the San Antonio Spurs (1973–1974).

His best season was with San Diego under Coach K.C. Jones, when he averaged 11.9 points and 4.4 rebounds.

He missed the 1967–1968 and 1968–1969 seasons due to military service.

In 1968, he was involved in one of the most significant transactions in NBA history when he was traded by the Lakers, along with Archie Clark and Darrall Imhoff to the Philadelphia 76ers for Hall-of-Famer Wilt Chamberlain. Chambers never played for the 76ers, as they subsequently traded him to Phoenix.

Chambers retired with 2,667 combined NBA/ABA career points, averaging 8.3 points and 3.2 rebounds.

Honors/Personal
Chambers and the 1966 Final Four Utah team were honored on March 4, 2017 at halftime of the Utah game against Stanford.

Chambers worked for the Los Angeles City Parks and Recreation department for many years.

Notes

1943 births
Living people
African-American basketball players
Atlanta Hawks players
Basketball players from Washington, D.C.
Buffalo Braves players
Junior college men's basketball players in the United States
Los Angeles Lakers draft picks
Los Angeles Lakers players
Phoenix Suns players
Portland Trail Blazers expansion draft picks
San Antonio Spurs players
San Diego Conquistadors players
Small forwards
Utah Utes men's basketball players
American men's basketball players
21st-century African-American people
20th-century African-American sportspeople
Eastern High School (Washington, D.C.) alumni